Melville Township may refer to the following townships in the United States:

 Melville Township, Audubon County, Iowa
 Melville Township, Renville County, Minnesota